Cathaya is a genus in the pine family, Pinaceae, with one known living species, Cathaya argyrophylla. Cathaya is a member of the subfamily Laricoideae, most closely related to Pseudotsuga and Larix. A second species, C. nanchuanensis, is now treated as a synonym, as it does not differ from C. argyrophylla in any characters.

Cathaya is confined to a limited area in southern China, in the provinces of Guangxi, Guizhou, Hunan and southeast Sichuan. It is found on steep, narrow mountain slopes at 950–1800 m altitude, on limestone soils. A larger population has been reduced by over-cutting before its scientific discovery and protection in 1950.

The leaves are needle-like, 2.5–5 cm long, have ciliate (hairy) margins when young, and grow around the stems in a spiral pattern. The cones are 3–5 cm long, with about 15–20 scales, each scale bearing two winged seeds.

One or two botanists, unhappy with the idea of a new genus in such a familiar family, tried to shoehorn it into other existing genera, as Pseudotsuga argyrophylla and Tsuga argyrophylla. It is however very distinct from both of these genera, and these combinations are not now used.

The Butchart Gardens in Victoria, British Columbia had a small living specimen. The tree died in 2017.

Fossil record
Cathaya sp. fossils are described from the early Pleistocene of southern Portugal. They are abundant in European brown coal deposits dating from between 10–30 million years ago.

References

External links
Gymnosperm Database: Cathaya argyrophylla
Conifers Around the World: Cathaya argyrophylla

Laricoideae
Endemic flora of China
Trees of China
Flora of Guangxi
Flora of Guizhou
Flora of Hunan
Flora of Sichuan
Extant Rupelian first appearances
Monotypic conifer genera
Vulnerable flora of Asia
Rupelian genus first appearances